Benjamin Snell Jr. (born February 26, 1998) is an American football running back for the Pittsburgh Steelers of the National Football League (NFL). He played college football at Kentucky. Snell is the great-nephew of former New York Jets running back Matt Snell.  His father, Benjamin Snell, Sr. is an alumnus of Ohio Northern University, played in the NFL Europe and the XFL.

Early years
Snell Jr. attended Westerville Central High School. During his time there, he won two Ohio Capital Conference titles. During his junior season, Snell Jr. rushed for 2,077 yards while scoring 26 touchdowns on the ground, he also had two receiving touchdowns that year. As a senior, he totaled 1,826 rushing yards, 264 receiving yards and 29 touchdowns. Snell Jr. was rated as a three-star recruit. He chose Kentucky over Iowa, Cincinnati, Boston College, Toledo and West Virginia.

College career

Freshman
As a freshman in 2016, Snell rushed for 1,091 rushing yards, breaking the Kentucky freshman rushing record which was held by Moe Williams. Snell Jr. managed to score 13 rushing touchdowns. During his freshman season, Snell Jr set six UK freshman records, including most rushing touchdowns in a game (4), most rushing yards by a freshman (1,091), most rushing touchdowns by a freshman (13), most total touchdowns by a freshman (13), most 100-yard rushing games (5) and most rushing yards by a freshman in a single game (192). At the end of his freshman season Snell Jr, was selected as a True Freshman All-American by ESPN and 247Sports, Football Writers Association of America (FWAA) Freshman All-American, Freshman All-SEC and a Second-team All-SEC pick by Pro Football Focus.

Sophomore
As a sophomore in 2017, Snell rushed for 1,333 rushing yards and scored 19 rushing touchdowns. Snell Jr. became the first Kentucky player with 10 or more career 100-yard rushing games prior to his junior season. He became the only SEC player since 2000 to have at least 116 rushing yards and at least three rushing touchdowns in three consecutive games. Snell Jr. became the ninth player in school history to reach 2,000 rushing yards in his career and the 19th player in SEC history to reach 2,000 career rushing yards prior to his junior season. He became the only player in school history to have back-to-back 1,000 rushing yard seasons. Snell Jr. was selected as a preseason Associated Press All-SEC First-team and All-SEC Second-team. In addition, Snell Jr. was put on the Doak Walker Award Watch List and the Maxwell Award Watch List.

Junior
As a junior in 2018, Snell rushed for 1,449 rushing yards and scored 16 rushing touchdowns. Snell Jr. became one of four running backs in SEC history to have three consecutive 1,000 rushing yard seasons, the others being Herschel Walker, Darren McFadden, and Alex Collins. Snell Jr. would also become the school's career rushing yards leader after scoring on a 12 yard touchdown run against the  Penn State Nittany Lions in the 2019 Citrus Bowl. This 43 year old record, previously held by Sonny Collins, was broken in just three seasons by Snell. Snell was voted First-team All-SEC by SEC Coaches. He would announce on December 14, 2018 that he would forgo his senior season and enter the 2019 NFL Draft.

Career Statistics

Professional career

Snell was drafted by the Pittsburgh Steelers in the fourth round with the 122nd overall pick in the 2019 NFL Draft. 

In Week 13 against the Cleveland Browns, Snell rushed 16 times for 63 yards and his first career rushing touchdown in the 20–13 win. In Week 17 against the Baltimore Ravens, Snell rushed 18 times for 91 yards and a touchdown during the 28–10 loss. As a rookie, Snell finished with 108 carries for 426 rushing yards and two rushing touchdowns.

Snell's first big breakthrough came on Monday Night Football against the New York Giants in Week 1 of the 2020 season after starter James Conner suffered an injury. He finished with 19 carries for 113 rushing yards as the Steelers won 26–16.
In Week 15 against the Cincinnati Bengals on Monday Night Football, Snell recorded 107 yards from scrimmage and a rushing touchdown during the 27–17 loss.

NFL career statistics

References

External links
Pittsburgh Steelers bio
Kentucky Wildcats bio

1998 births
Living people
People from Westerville, Ohio
Players of American football from Columbus, Ohio
American football running backs
Kentucky Wildcats football players
Pittsburgh Steelers players